Frome was a rural district in Somerset, England, from 1894 to 1974.  

The district was created in 1894 under the Local Government Act 1894. It was abolished in 1974 under the Local Government Act 1972 when it became part of the district of Mendip.

The parishes which were part of the district included Beckington, Berkley, Buckland Dinham, Coleford, Frome, Great Elm, Hemington, Kilmersdon, Leigh on Mendip, Lullington, Mells, Norton St Philip, Nunney, Rode, Selwood, Tellisford, Trudoxhill, Upton Noble, Wanstrow, Whatley and Witham Friary.

References

External links 
Frome Rural District at Britain through Time

Districts of England created by the Local Government Act 1894
Districts of England abolished by the Local Government Act 1972
History of Somerset
Local government in Somerset
Rural districts of England